Payee Lake is situated in centre of meadow in Payee, near Shogran in Kaghan Valley, Khyber Pakhtunkhwa the province of Pakistan. It is located at the height of almost .
It is surrounded by Makra Peak, Malika Parbat, Musa ka Musala and the mountains of Kashmir.The lake is accessible via Kiwai passing through Shogran by a jeep track. There is a problem in breathing there due to elevation.

See also
 Shogran
 Siri Lake
 Pyala Lake
 Kaghan Valley
 Naran
 Lake Saiful Muluk

References

Tourist attractions in Khyber Pakhtunkhwa
Hill stations in Pakistan
Mansehra District

Lakes of Khyber Pakhtunkhwa